Rizky may refer to:

Suci Rizky Andini (born 1993), Indonesian badminton player
Rizky Darmawan (born 1994), Indonesian professional footballer
Rizky Febian (born 1998), Indonesian singer, songwriter, actor and TV presenter
Rizky Dwi Febrianto (born 1997), Indonesian professional footballer
Rizky Ramdani Lestaluhu (born 1991), Indonesian professional footballer
Rizky Yusuf Nasution (born 1997), Indonesian professional footballer
Rizky Pellu (born 1992), Indonesian professional footballer
Rizky Pora (born 1989), Indonesian professional footballer
Rizky Eka Pratama (born 1999), Indonesian professional footballer
Rizky Ramadhana (born 1992), Indonesian professional footballer
Rizky Ridho (born 2001), Indonesian professional footballer
Defri Rizky (born 1988), Indonesian professional footballer
Ega Rizky (born 1992), Indonesian professional footballer